Leonid Chernovetskyi Bloc was a regional political alliance supporting the Mayor of Kyiv Leonid Chernovetskyi based in the city of Kyiv. At the 2008 combined Kyiv Mayoral election and Kyiv City Council election the party won the most seats in the Kyiv City Council. Although the alliance intended to run nationally in the October 2012 parliamentary elections the faction of the Bloc disbanded itself in the Kyiv City Council on September 22, 2011. All the deputies that were members of the faction at the time where then considered as independents.

Kyiv Mayoral election May 2008

At the May 2008 Kyiv City Council election the party won 43 out of the 120 seats (gaining 9% more votes).

Members
 Christian Liberal Party of Ukraine 
Ukrainian Party "Green Planet"
Women of Ukraine
 Christian Democratic Party of Ukraine (joined October 23, 2008)

See also
 Kyiv City Council

References

External links
Official website 

Conservative parties in Ukraine
Defunct political party alliances in Ukraine